The 2021 Paris Eternal season will be the third season of Paris Eternal's existence in the Overwatch League and their first under head coach Zouheir "GetAmazed" Baba.

Preceding offseason

Roster changes 
The Eternal entered free agency with six free agents, five of which became free agents due to the Eternal not exercising the option to retain the player for another year.

Acquisitions 
The Eternal announced the signing of six players on 9 December 2020. Amongst the signings were damage players Nikolai "Naga" Dereli, a rookie coming from Overwatch Contenders team Obey Alliance, and Stefan "Onigod" Fisherstrand, who spent four months with the Dallas Fuel in the previous season. The tank players signed were Daniel "Daan" Scheltema, a rookie main tank player with Overwatch Contenders team Revival, and Elliot "ELLIVOTE" Vaneryd, an off-tank player who had been in the league previously and most recently competed with Contenders team New Kings. The support players signed were Alberto "neptuNo" Gonzalez, a veteran player in the league coming from the Guangzhou Charge, and Emir "Kaan" Okumus, a rookie coming from Contenders team Obey Alliance. The team's only other acquisition of the offseason was Samir "Tsuna" Ikram, a damage player who had played for the Vancouver Titans for five months in the 2020 season, who was signed on 18 December.

Departures 
None of the Eternal's six free agents returned, five of which signed with other teams, beginning with support player Kwon "Fielder" Jun signing with the Dallas Fuel on 27 October 2020. In December, two more players were signed to new teams: tank player Benjamin "Benbest" Dieulafait was signed to Overwatch Contenders team Young and Beautiful on 10 December, and damage player Terence "Soon" Tarlier was signed to the Boston Uprising on 16 December. Two more players signed to new teams on 10 March: damage player Nicolas "NicoGDH" Moret signed with Overwatch Contenders team Young and Beautiful, and Eoghan "Smex" O'Neill signed with Contenders team Ex Oblivione. The Eternal's final free agent, tank player Jeong "Nosmite" Da-un did not sign with a team in the offseason.

Outside of free agency, the Eternal transferred several players to new teams, beginning with damage players Kim "SP9RK1E" Young-han and Choi "Hanbin" Han-been transferring to the Dallas Fuel on 23 October. They then transferred support player Brice "FDGod" Monsçavoir to the San Francisco Shock on 12 November. The final transfer of the season was damage player Jung "Xzi" Ki-hyo also transferring to the Fuel on 14 November.

Final roster

Transactions 
Transactions of/for players on the roster during the 2021 regular season:
On 6 May, the Eternal released support Alberto "neptuNo" González.
On 10 May, the Eternal signed support Arthur "Dridro" Szanto.
On 2 June, tank Elliot "ELLIVOTE" Vaneryd retired.
On 2 June, the Eternal signed tank Ilari "Vestola" Vestola.

Standings

Game log

Regular season 

|2021 season schedule

Postseason

References 

Paris Eternal
Paris Eternal season
Paris Eternal
Paris Eternal seasons